Newburyport is a coastal city in Essex County, Massachusetts, United States,  northeast of Boston. The population was 18,289 at the 2020 census. A historic seaport with a vibrant tourism industry, Newburyport includes part of Plum Island. The mooring, winter storage, and maintenance of recreational boats, motor and sail, still contribute a large part of the city's income. A Coast Guard station oversees boating activity, especially in the sometimes dangerous tidal currents of the Merrimack River.

At the edge of the Newbury Marshes, delineating Newburyport to the south, an industrial park provides a wide range of jobs. Newburyport is on a major north-south highway, Interstate 95. The outer circumferential highway of Boston, Interstate 495, passes nearby in Amesbury. The Newburyport Turnpike (U.S. Route 1) still traverses Newburyport on its way north. The Newburyport/Rockport MBTA commuter rail from Boston's North Station terminates in Newburyport. The earlier Boston and Maine Railroad leading farther north was discontinued, but a portion of it has been converted into a recreation trail.

History

 On January 28, 1764, the General Court of Massachusetts passed "An act for erecting part of the town of Newbury into a new town by the name of Newburyport." The act begins:Whereas the town of Newbury is very large, and the inhabitants of that part of it who dwell by the water-side there, as it is commonly called, are mostly merchants, traders and artificers, and the inhabitants of the other parts of the town are chiefly husbandmen; by means whereof many difficulties and disputes have arisen in managing their public affairs – Be it enacted ... That that part of the said town of Newbury ... be and hereby are constituted and made a separate and distinct town ....

The act was approved by Governor Francis Bernard on February 4, 1764. There were three shipyards, no bridges, and several ferries, one of which at the foot of Greenleaf Lane, now State Street, carried the Portsmouth Flying Stage Coach, running between Portsmouth, New Hampshire, and Boston.

The town prospered and became a city in 1851. Situated near the mouth of the Merrimack River, it was once a fishing, shipbuilding and shipping center, with an industry in silverware manufacture. In 1792, a bridge was built two miles above the town where the river contained an island. Merrimack Arms and Brown Manufacturing Company made Southerner Derringer pistols in their Newburyport factory from 1867 to 1873. The sea captains of old Newburyport (as elsewhere in Massachusetts) had participated vigorously in the triangular trade, importing West Indian molasses and exporting rum made from it. The distilleries were located around Market Square near the waterfront. Caldwell's Old Newburyport rum was manufactured locally until 1961.

Newburyport once had a fishing fleet that operated from Georges Bank to the mouth of the Merrimack River. It was a center for privateering during the Revolutionary War and War of 1812. Beginning about 1832, it added numerous ships to the whaling fleet. Later, clipper ships were built there. Today, the city gives little hint of its former maritime importance. Notably missing are the docks, which are shown on earlier maps extending into the channel of the Merrimack River, and the shipyards, where the waterfront parking lot is currently located.

George Whitefield, the well-known and influential English preacher who helped inspire the First Great Awakening in America, arrived in Newburyport in September 1740. The revival that followed his labors, brought into existence Old South Church, where he was buried after his death in 1770.

The city's historical highlights include:

Historic events:
 First of many clipper ships built here
 First "Tea Party" rebellion to oppose British Tea Tax
 First state mint and treasury building
 Newburyport Superior Courthouse, the oldest continuously active courthouse in Massachusetts

The Newburyport Five Cents Savings Bank on State Street was founded in 1854, and is one of the oldest banks in the United States still in operation.

Historic houses and museums:
 Cushing House Museum & Garden
 Newburyport Custom House Museum (1835), designed by Robert Mills

Literary interests:
 Was referred to in the H. P. Lovecraft story, "The Shadow Over Innsmouth", as being located near Innsmouth. Lovecraft in fact based his depiction of Innsmouth largely on Newburyport. 
 Subject of the most ambitious community study ever undertaken, the Yankee City project conducted by anthropologist W. Lloyd Warner and his associates

Timeline 

 1635: Newbury incorporated.
 1761: Belleville Congregational Church founded.
 1764: Newburyport incorporated (formerly part of Newbury).
 1772: Marine Society of Newburyport established.
 1773
 Isaiah Thomas opens "a printing house in King Street."
 Essex Journal newspaper begins publication.
 1790: Population: 4,837.
 1793: Impartial Herald newspaper begins publication.
 1794
 Morning Star newspaper begins publication.
 Newburyport Woolen Manufacturing Co. established.
 1795
 Political Gazette newspaper begins publication.
 Merrimack Bank incorporated.
 1797: Newburyport Herald newspaper begins publication.
 1799: Newburyport Marine Insurance Co. incorporated.
 1801: American Intelligencer newspaper published.
 1802: Merrimac Humane Society established.
 1803
 Merrimack Gazette and New England Repertory newspapers begin publication.
 Newburyport Female Charitable Society organized.
 Merrimack Fire and Marine Insurance Co. incorporated.
 1804: Political Calendar newspaper begins publication.
 1805: Merrimack Magazine begins publication.
 1807: Newburyport Gazette newspaper begins publication.
 1808: Statesman newspaper begins publication.
 1810
 Newburyport Mechanick Association and Newburyport Athenaeum incorporated.
 Independent Whig newspaper begins publication.
 Merrimack Bible Society organized.
 1812: Washington Benevolent Society organized.
 1818: Howard Benevolent Society instituted "for the relief of the sick and destitute."
 1825: Newburyport Hosiery Co. established.
 1829: Newburyport Lyceum organized.
 1835
 Society for the Relief of Aged Females founded.
 U.S. Custom House built.
 1836
 Newburyport Linnean Society and Newburyport Steam Cotton Co. incorporated.
 Newburyport Silk Co. and Newburyport Ladies' Bethel Society established.
 1837: Bartlet Steam Mills incorporated.
 1840: Pleasant Street Christian Church organized.
 1841: Essex North District Medical Society organized.
 1842: James Steam Mills incorporated.
 1844: Essex Steam Mills incorporated.
 1845: Globe Steam Mills and Ocean Steam Mills incorporated.
 1850
 Ladies' General Charitable Society instituted.
 Newburyport Gas Co. incorporated.
 1851: June 18: Essex North Musical convention held.
 1852: Merrimack Library Association organized.
 1854
 Newburyport Public Library founded.
 Newburyport Five Cents Savings Bank incorporated.
 1855: Newburyport Library Association organized.
 1857: Mechanic Library Association incorporated.
 1865: Washington Street Methodist Episcopal Church organized.
 1869: Merrimack Marine Railway Co. incorporated.
 1874: Newburyport Mutual Benefit Association organized.
 1877: Antiquarian and Historical Society of Old Newbury established.
 1878: Newburyport Athenaeum organized.
 1884: Newburyport YMCA incorporated.
 1886: Newburyport Society for the Relief of Aged Men incorporated.
 1887: Newburyport Electric Light & Power Co. incorporated.
 1888: Daily News established.
 1890
 YWCA of Newburyport incorporated.
 City Improvement society organized.
 1896: Newburyport Choral Union organized.
 1904: South End Reading Room Association formed.
 1906: Newburyport Homeoepathic Hospital opens.
 1917: Annunciation Greek Orthodox Church of Newburyport founded.
 1968: Newburyport Maritime Society established.
 1971: Market Square Historic District added to National Register of Historic Places.
 1971-1979: Downtown undergoes major renewal and historic preservation effort.
 1991: Actors Studio of Newburyport founded.
 1994: Sister city relationship established with Bura, Taita-Taveta District, Kenya.

Historic preservation

Despite its former prosperity, in the 1950s and 1960s Newburyport's center fell into disrepair because of several factors, most notably strip malls taking away from local business and increased use of the automobile. At this time, construction of major highways brought larger cities such as Lawrence and Lowell into shopping range. Consequently, by 1970 Newburyport's historic downtown section was scheduled to be razed prior to reconstruction with federal money. Ideas to rebuild the city's downtown were numerous, ranging from hotels and new stores to, ironically, a strip mall, with few buildings left for historical reasons. At the last moment, however, the city changed its mind and signed a federal grant that allowed it to keep most of its historic architecture. Renovation and restorations began during the early 1970s, and continued throughout most of the decade, initially along State Street, and culminating with creation of a pedestrian mall along Inn Street.  Newburyport is often cited as an example by preservationists of how to maintain a city's architecture and heritage, while still having it remain functional and liveable.

Geography

Newburyport is located at  (42.812391, −70.877440).

The city is part of Massachusetts' North Shore; Newburyport was laid out on the elevated south bank of the Merrimack River between the river and Newbury marshes. The shipyards, now boatyards (and still vigorously active), extended along the bank at the edge of the river. They were connected by Merrimac Street, which ends upriver where the bank merges into bluffs covered with pine forest. Colonial residences extend up the bank from Merrimac Street to High Street running parallel to it near the top of the ridge. The homes of the seafaring entrepreneurs line High Street. Many feature widow's walks, structures on the roof where the residents could watch for the return of sailing vessels. Nearly every home maintains a splendid flower garden, most dating to colonial times. Various cross streets, such as State Street, Green Street and Market Street, connect Merrimac Street and High Street. The top of the ridge proved an ideal location for later institutions, such as Newburyport High School and nearby Anna Jaques Hospital. The ridge drops more sharply to the marsh on the other side. Along its margin a third parallel street developed, Low Street.

The river bank gradually descends to marshes at Joppa Flats beyond downtown Newburyport. The Plum Island Turnpike was pushed out over the marsh on a causeway to a narrow part of the Plum Island River just to the south of where it connects to the mouth of the Merrimack. A drawbridge was built there, the only access to the island by road. On the Newburyport side a small airport, Plum Island Airport, was built at the edge of the marsh. The portion of Plum Island that is in the city has no direct access to the rest of the city; similarly, there is no access between the mainland and Woodbridge Island or Seal Island, west of Plum Island (the latter being shared between Newburyport and Newbury). Several parks and beaches dot the city, including Plum Island Point Beach, Simmons Beach, Joppa Park, Waterfront Park, Woodman Park, Cashman Park, Moseley Pines Park and Atkinson Common and March's Hill Park.  Newburyport Forest is located in the southwest corner of the city, and Maudslay State Park lies along the northwest part of the city, along the banks of the Merrimack.

Neighborhoods
Joppa: 
Joppa is bordered by Newbury to the southeast, the South End to the southwest, and Downtown to the Northwest. This is the closest neighborhood to Plum Island Airport located in Newbury.

South End: 
The South End is bordered by Newbury to the south, Joppa to the northeast, and Downtown to the northwest. The border between the South End and Joppa is just behind Hancock Street, Chestnut Street, and, Part of Prospect Street.

Climate

Demographics

As of the census of 2010, there were 17,416 people, 8,264 households, and 4,428 families residing in the city. The racial makeup of the city was 90.2% White, 3.6% African American, 0.1% Native American, 0.61% Asian, 0.01% Pacific Islander, 0.16% from other races, and 1.2% from two or more races. Hispanic or Latino people of any race were 2.7% of the population. The top five ethnic groups are: (United States 2010 Census quickfacts)

 Irish – 25% 
 English – 16%
 Italian – 11%
 French (except Basque) – 7%
 German – 6%

There were 7,519 households, out of which 25.9% had children under the age of 18 living with them, 47.7% were married couples living together, 8.5% had a female householder with no husband present, and 41.1% were non-families. Of all households 33.1% were made up of individuals, and 9.7% had someone living alone who was 65 years of age or older. The average household size was 2.24 and the average family size was 2.90.

In the city, the population was spread out, with 20.7% under the age of 18, 4.4% from 18 to 24, 32.7% from 25 to 44, 28.2% from 45 to 64, and 14.0% who were 65 years of age or older. The median age was 41 years. For every 100 females, there were 86.7 males. For every 100 females age 18 and over, there were 82.9 males.

The median income for a household in the city was $78,557, and the median income for a family was $103,306. Males had a median income of $51,831 versus $37,853 for females. The per capita income for the city was $34,187. About 2.8% of families and 5.2% of the population were below the poverty line, including 4.5% of those under age 18 and 6.9% of those age 65 or over.

Government

Upon adopting a new charter in 2011 which took effect in 2013, Newburyport has been run by a mayor with a four-year term and an eleven-member City Council (prior to that, the mayor's term lasted for two years). During the mid-twentieth century, Newburyport enjoyed a typical "small community" approach, conducted, most notably, by city mayor and activist Ed Molin, who died in 2005. The current mayor of Newburyport is Sean Reardon, and the next election year for mayor is 2025.

Newburyport is part of the Massachusetts Senate's 1st Essex district.

Transportation
Interstate 95 passes through the western side of town, with one exit at Route 113.  Route 113 itself has its eastern terminus at U.S. Route 1 and Massachusetts Route 1A, with Route 1A continuing along the same right of way as 113 towards Newbury.  Route 1 and 1A cross the river along the Newburyport Turnpike Bridge; it had originally followed State Street and ended at Merrimac and Water streets before crossing the river via ferry to Salisbury.  The Turnpike Bridge is the easternmost crossing of the Merrimack; upstream the river is crossed by the Newburyport Railroad Bridge (just west of the Turnpike Bridge), the Chain Bridge, one of the oldest bridges along the river, and the Whittier Memorial Bridge, which brings Interstate 95 to Amesbury.

The Merrimack Valley Regional Transit Authority provides regular bus service between the city and Haverhill, which includes access to the commuter rail station in Newburyport. The bus costs $1.25 for adults paying cash and $1 for adults paying with CharlieCard. C&J and Coach Company, privately operated coach carriers, operate commuter bus services between Newburyport and Boston. Newburyport is the northern terminus of the Newburyport/Rockport Line of the MBTA Commuter Rail system, providing access through several North Shore cities to Boston's North Station.

Plum Island Airport is a privately owned general aviation airport located within the city limits. It is open to the public and managed by Plum Island Aerodrome, Inc., a not-for-profit organization. The nearest scheduled commercial air service can be found at Boston's Logan International Airport, Worcester's Worcester Regional Airport, Portsmouth's Pease International Tradeport or Manchester's Manchester-Boston Regional Airport.

Education

The current site of Newburyport High School was purchased from Harvard University early in the 20th century. Newburyport High School is one of the oldest public high schools in the United States.

Newburyport is served by several public schools, belonging to the Newburyport School District, and several private schools.

 Francis T. Bresnahan Lower Elementary School: pre-kindergarten to grade 3
 Edward G. Molin Upper Elementary School: grades 4 and 5
 Rupert A. Nock Middle School: grades 6 to 8
 Newburyport High School: grades 9 to 12
 River Valley Charter School: grades kindergarten to 8
 Immaculate Conception Catholic School: grades pre-kindergarten to 8
 Newburyport Montessori School: pre-kindergarten and kindergarten

On Monday, November 4, 2019, the Newburyport School Committee unanimously (with one member absent) voted to implement a Start School Later policy, the first of the Cape Ann League to do so.

The times will be:

 Francis T. Bresnahan Lower Elementary School: pre-kindergarten to grade 3; 8:20–2:50
 Edward G. Molin Upper Elementary School: grades 4 and 5; and Rupert A. Nock Middle School: grades 6 to 8; 7:45–2:15
 Newburyport High School: grades 9 to 12; 8:15–2:45

Newburyport is served by the Newburyport Public Library, part of the Merrimack Valley Library Consortium.

Newburyport High School competes in the Cape Ann League, an athletic conference in District A of the Massachusetts Interscholastic Athletic Association. The athletics program offers a variety of sports for girls and boys during the fall, winter, and spring seasons. The school colors are Crimson and Old Gold and the mascot is a Clipper Ship.

Activities

Newburyport makes activities available for its residents, including a year-round ice skating rink and a beautiful waterfront and boardwalk. Many Newburyport residents love boating, fishing, swimming, and other water sports. The city's picturesque downtown shopping district also makes it a great location to enjoy boutique shopping. The city sponsors several youth sports leagues, including baseball, football, soccer, lacrosse, basketball, and hockey. The city's youth services program also provides classes, campouts, and activities in robotics, music, rock climbing, chess, fencing, sewing, dance, skateboarding, judo, academics, cooking, yoga, cheerleading, art, fashion design, photography, biking, and frisbee.

Annual events

Yankee Homecoming
Yankee Homecoming, run not by the city, but by the non-profit Yankee Homecoming, Inc., is the annual festival celebrating the natives coming home to Newburyport. The event was initiated in 1957 by native Newburyporter George Cashman, who sought to stimulate the economy and lift the spirit of the citizens.

It lasts one week. The first Sunday of the festival, known as "Olde Fashioned Sunday", is celebrated at the Bartlet Mall in Newburyport, and features many activities, including an art show, an appearance by the city's oldest fire engine, the "Neptune #8", and the participation of many local businesses. There is also an antique car parade. Each Yankee Homecoming features a grand marshal and numerous street vendors.

The festival includes eight days and over 200 events. There are concerts every night at Market Landing Park.  Other popular events include the Newburyport Lions'  and 5-kilometer road races, which run through the city's downtown streets and neighborhoods. There is also a 45-minute fireworks show on Saturday night, which is followed the concluding Sunday by the famous Yankee Homecoming parade.

First held in 1958, Newburyport's "Yankee Homecoming" is the second-oldest homecoming festival in the United States. Many charities raise their funds during this time.

Waterfront Concert Series
This was held Friday evenings in Waterfront Park in downtown Newburyport, these free concerts were intended for all ages. The concerts were presented by the Newburyport Chamber of Commerce and the Waterfront Trust and were sponsored by a local insurance agency, Arthur S Page Insurance.

Newburyport Literary Festival
Held during the last weekend of April, the Newburyport Literary Festival was started in 2006 as a new effort by the city to increase interest in reading and literary arts. Many local authors are invited to sign and chat about their books, and schoolchildren create projects to show to an author who visits their school. Among the authors who regularly visit are Andre Dubus III, Tess Gerritsen and Rhina Espaillat.

Points of interest

Over the years, the town has cultivated a significant tourist population. The quaint downtown shopping center includes businesses that appeal to all ages. Local businesses and restaurants surround Market Square and along State Street. During festivals throughout the year, visitors are invited to enjoy concerts, food, and entertainment. An old mill building on Liberty Street is home to other small businesses and a local farmers' market during both the summer and winter seasons. The historic area has a charming feel and upbeat atmosphere.

High Street is a remarkable street of fine old Federal-style houses, linking the Atkinson Common (1893–1894) with the Bartlett Mall, site of the Charles Bulfinch-designed Essex County Superior Courthouse (1805). Laid out in 1801, the Bartlett Mall was redesigned in the 1880s by noted Boston landscape architect Charles Eliot, with later improvements by Arthur Shurcliff.

First Presbyterian Church dates from 1756. The clock tower bell was cast by Paul Revere. One of the most famous individuals in 18th-century America, evangelist George Whitefield, before dying in Newburyport in 1770, asked that his remains be buried under the pulpit of the "Old South" church, and they are there to this day.

Some other points of interest are the city's historic waterfront, Atwood Park located in the south end of Newburyport, Market Square & Inn Street, Cashman Park, and Brown Square, graced with a statue to "Garrison the Liberator", before the City Hall. The recently restored City Hall itself is a fine old building featuring in the first floor corridor a portrait gallery of some of those who have fallen in service of their country. Others are listed on the central monument in Atkinson Common.

 Chain Bridge
 Cushing House Museum & Garden
 Joppa Flats Education Center and Wildlife Sanctuary
 Maudslay State Park
 Newburyport Brewing Company
 Parker River National Wildlife Refuge

In popular culture
Newburyport was the inspiration for the city of Innsmouth, the setting of the H. P. Lovecraft story The Shadow Over Innsmouth, part of the Cthulhu Mythos. The narrative also cameos the actual Newburyport in the first chapter. It is where the protagonist sets out from on his journey to Innsmouth.
It was also mentioned in Stephen King's, "Doctor Sleep," when it explains Dan's drinking. Also, the 2019 Goldsmiths Prize winner, "Ducks, Newburyport", featured the city.

Notable people

 John Quincy Adams (1767–1848), U.S. president, resided in Newburyport 1787–1788
 Charlotte Johnson Baker (1855–1937), physician
 Nikole Beckwith (born 1980), Newburyport-born writer and filmmaker
 Kate Bolick (born 1972), Newburyport-born and raised author and essayist
 John Parker Boyd (1764–1830), U.S. Army Brigadier General in the War of 1812
 John Bromfield, Jr. (1779–1849), merchant
 John H. Couch (1811–1870), sea captain, pioneer and a founder of Portland, Oregon
 Osmond Richard Cummings (1923–2013), author and historian
 Caleb Cushing (1800–1879), diplomat and politician
 Timothy Dexter (1748–1806), businessman noted for his writing and eccentricity
 Andre Dubus III (born 1959), novelist
 William Lloyd Garrison (1805–1879), abolitionist
 Edmund Pike Graves (1891–1919), aviator who served as a fighter pilot during WWI and the Polish-Soviet War
 Áine Greaney (born ), writer and editor
 Adolphus Greely (1844–1935), polar explorer
 Edwin A. Grosvenor (1845–1936), author and professor of history 
 Laura Coombs Hills (1859–1952), painter
 Judith Hoag (born 1968) actress
 Lucy Hooper (1816–1841), poet
 Charles Tillinghast James (1805–1862), mechanical engineer, designer, senator
 Benjamin H. Jellison (1845–1904), Medal of Honor recipient in the American Civil War
 Joe Keery (born 1992), actor
 Rufus King (1755–1827), diplomat and politician
 Thomas B. Lawson (1807–1888), artist
 Francis Cabot Lowell (1775–1817), manufacturer
 John Lowell (1743–1802), congressman and federal judge
 George Lunt (1803–1885), editor, lawyer, author, politician
 John P. Marquand (1893–1960), author
 Donald McKay (1810–1880), shipbuilder
 Jonathan Meath (born 1955), television producer
 Johnny Messner (born 1970), actor
 Robert S. Mulliken (1896–1986), recipient of 1966 Nobel Prize in Chemistry
 Theophilus Parsons (1750–1813), jurist
 James Parton (1822–1891), biographer
 Edmund Pearson (1880–1937), librarian and true crime writer
 Jacob Perkins (1766–1849), early American inventor
 Timothy Pilsbury (1789–1858), congressman from Texas
 Harriet Prescott Spofford (1835–1921), writer
 Charles A. Spring (1800–1891), influential Presbyterian leader in Iowa and Illinois
 Rev. Gardiner Spring (1785–1873), author of the Gardiner Spring Resolutions, which gained Abraham Lincoln the support of the Presbyterian Church
 Rev. Samuel Spring (1746–1819), religious leader, chaplain in Benedict Arnold's army
 Clara F. Stevens (1855–1934), English professor at Mount Holyoke College
 Matthew Thornton (1714–1803), signer of the Declaration of Independence
 William S. Tilton (1828–1889), Civil War brigade commander at the Battle of Gettysburg
 Peter Tolan (born 1958), television/film producer and writer
 Richard Trefry, (1924-2023), United States Army lieutenant general. 
 Charles Turner (1848–1908), painter, born in Newburyport
 William Gordon Welchman (1906–1985) English Mathematician, University Professor, Second World War codebreaker at Bletchley Park, United Kingdom 
 William Wheelwright (1798–1873), sea captain, US consul in Chile, steamship and railroad promoter in South America
 Lothrop Withington (1856-1915), genealogist, historian, and book editor who was killed in the sinking of the RMS Lusitania
 Martha Wright (1923–2016), singer and Broadway actress

See also
 The Daily News of Newburyport
 Following Atticus, 2012 book
 Newburyport Public Library
 List of newspapers in Massachusetts in the 18th century: Newburyport

References

Bibliography

 Published in 18th–19th centuries
 
 
 
 
  Newburyport: Stephen H. Fowle, 1874
 
 
 
  Two volumes, 957 and 1173 pages. Newburyport is in Volume II; however, there are scattered facts throughout. The first half of Volume I is downloadable from Google Books. Republished (1992) by Higginson Book Company, . In that edition, Hurd is called an editor.
 

 Published in 20th century
 
  Two volumes. Reprints and facsimiles exist.
 Oliver B. Merrill. North End Papers, 1618–1880, Newburyport, Massachusetts. Newburyport Daily News, 1906–1908.
  (v.2)
 
 
 Fanny Louise Walton. Historic nuggets of Newburyport. Newburyport, Mass.: Newburyport Press, 1958
 

 Published in 21st century

External links

 
1635 establishments in Massachusetts
Cities in Essex County, Massachusetts
Cities in Massachusetts
Populated coastal places in Massachusetts
Populated places established in 1635
Massachusetts populated places on the Merrimack River